Le Guédeniau is a former commune in the Maine-et-Loire department in western France. On 1 January 2016, it was merged into the commune of Baugé-en-Anjou.

See also 

 Communes of the Maine-et-Loire department

References 

Former communes of Maine-et-Loire
Maine-et-Loire communes articles needing translation from French Wikipedia